Gabriel Vasconcelos Ferreira (born 27 September 1992), mononymously known as Gabriel, is a Brazilian professional footballer who plays as a goalkeeper for Coritiba.

A product of Cruzeiro's youth system, Gabriel was signed by Milan at the age of 19. He has since spent time both at the club and on various loans.

At the international level, Gabriel made a single appearance for the Brazil national team in August 2012. Previously, he was part of the under-23 squad that won the silver medal at the 2012 Summer Olympics in London.

Club career

Cruzeiro (2007–2012) 
Gabriel started his footballing career in the youth teams of Cruzeiro in 2007. During the 2010 and 2011 seasons, he also featured as an unused substitute with the first team on four occasions, including one game of the 2011 Campeonato Mineiro, which Cruzeiro eventually won.

Milan (2012–2018)

Early seasons (2012–2014) 
At the beginning of the 2012–13 season, Gabriel was signed by Milan to serve as backup for Christian Abbiati and Marco Amelia. After making no official appearances during his first year at the club, Gabriel's official debut came on 19 October 2013, as manager Massimiliano Allegri chose him to start in place of an injured Abbiati for a Serie A game at home against Udinese; the Brazilian kept a clean sheet in the 1–0 win. He finished his second season at Milan with seven appearances.

Loan spells (2014–2018) 
On 1 September 2014, Gabriel joined Serie B side Carpi on a season-long loan from Milan. Serving as the first-choice goalkeeper, he played 39 league games out of 42, all as a starter, and contributed to the club's successful season, in which they finished at the top of the table and won their first-ever promotion to Serie A.

For the 2015–16 season, Gabriel moved to Serie A club Napoli, once again on a season-long loan. Serving as Pepe Reina's understudy, Gabriel finished the season with four appearances (one in the league, three in Europa League).

Gabriel went back to Milan for the 2016–17 season. However, being second-choice to Gianluigi Donnarumma, he didn't get any playing time in the competitive games during the first half of the season. In January 2017, he was loaned out to Cagliari for the rest of the season. However, he still didn't get regular playing time, making only three appreances.

After returning to Milan for the 2017–18 season, Gabriel once again failed to make any competitive appearance, having fallen back to fourth choice behind the Donnarumma brothers and Marco Storari. On 30 January 2018, he was loaned out to Serie B side Empoli for the remainder of the season.

Perugia
On 17 August 2018, Gabriel signed with Serie B club Perugia for free.

Lecce
On 3 July 2019, Gabriel signed with Serie A club U.S. Lecce a 2-years contract.

International career

Brazil Under-20 
Gabriel was part of the Brazil under-20 squad that won the South American Youth Championship in February 2011, appearing in eight games out of nine.

The following August he was called up by manager Ney Franco to take part also in the FIFA under-20 World Cup. He played in all seven games as a starter, as Brazil claimed the trophy by defeating Portugal 3–2 in the final at El Campín stadium.

Brazil Under-23 
Gabriel was called up by Brazil under-23 to take part in the 2012 Olympic Football tournament as a replacement for the injured Rafael Cabral two days before the start of the competition. After remaining on the bench for the first two games, Gabriel made his debut in the tournament in the third and last match of the group stage against New Zealand, which Brazil won 3–0. He retained his place as a starter in each of the following three games, as Brazil went on to win the silver medal after being defeated 2–1 by Mexico in the final.

Brazil 
Three days after playing in the Olympic final, on 15 August 2012, Gabriel made his senior debut for Brazil, featuring as a starter in a 3–0 friendly win over Sweden, having the distinction of playing his first professional match at full international level.

Career statistics

Club

Honours

Club 
Cruzeiro
Campeonato Mineiro: 2011

Carpi
Serie B: 2014–15

Milan
Supercoppa Italiana: 2016

Empoli
Serie B: 2017–18

International 
Brazil
South American Youth Championship: 2011
FIFA U-20 World Cup: 2011
Olympic Silver Medal: 2012

References

External links 

 
 
 

1992 births
A.C. Milan players
Association football goalkeepers
Brazil international footballers
Brazil under-20 international footballers
Brazil youth international footballers
Brazilian expatriate sportspeople in Italy
Brazilian expatriate footballers
Brazilian footballers
Cagliari Calcio players
A.C. Carpi players
Cruzeiro Esporte Clube players
S.S.C. Napoli players
Empoli F.C. players
A.C. Perugia Calcio players
U.S. Lecce players
Coritiba Foot Ball Club players
Expatriate footballers in Italy
Footballers at the 2012 Summer Olympics
Living people
Medalists at the 2012 Summer Olympics
Sportspeople from Minas Gerais
Olympic footballers of Brazil
Olympic medalists in football
Olympic silver medalists for Brazil
Serie A players
Serie B players
Campeonato Brasileiro Série A players